This is a list of artificial and natural lakes in Nepal ordered by province, and by district within each province.

The largest lake in Nepal is Rara Lake, also known as Mahendra Daha, in Karnali Province.

Phoksundo Lake in Karnali Province is the deepest lake of Nepal, having a depth of 136 m.

Tilicho Lake in Gandaki Province is the highest lake of Nepal, at 4919 m above mean sea level.

Bagmati Province

Bhaktapur District

Chitwan District

Dhading District

Dolakha District

Kathmandu District

Lalitpur District

Makwanpur District

Nuwakot District

Ramechhap District

Rasuwa District

Sindhuli District

Sindhupalchowk District

Gandaki Province

Baglung District

Gorkha District

Kaski District

Lamjung District

Manang District

Myagdi District

Parbat District

Syangja District

Tanahun District

Nawalparasi District (former district)

Karnali Province

Dailekh District

Dolpa District

Humla District

Jumla District

Mugu District

Salyan District

Lumbini Province

Arghakhanchi District

Banke District

Bardiya District

Dang District

Gulmi District

Palpa District

Pyuthan District

Rupandehi District

Madhesh Province

Bara District

Dhanusha District

Mahottari District

Parsa District

Rautahat District

Saptari District

Sarlahi District

Siraha District

Province No. 1

Bhojpur District

Dhankuta District

Ilam District

Jhapa District

Khotang District

Morang District

Panchthar District

Sankhuwasabha District

Solukhumbu District

Sunsari District

Taplejung District

Tehrathum District

Udayapur District

Sudurpashchim Province

Achham District

Bajhang District

Bajura District

Dadeldhura District

Darchula District

Doti District

Kailali District

Kanchanpur District

See also 

 List of rivers of Nepal
 History of limnology in Nepal

References

External links 
 Popular Lakes in Nepal

Nepal
Lakes